Víctor Hugo Campos (born 14 June 1937) is a Bolivian sports shooter. He competed in the mixed trap event at the 1984 Summer Olympics.

References

1937 births
Living people
Bolivian male sport shooters
Olympic shooters of Bolivia
Shooters at the 1984 Summer Olympics
Place of birth missing (living people)